Joseph Albert Britton (1839–1929), most commonly known as J.A. Britton, was a builder of bridges in Indiana.  He created many works that survive and are listed on the U.S. National Register of Historic Places.

Biography
According to a Historic American Engineering Record record, Britton was born in 1839 near Rockville, Indiana, and built approximately 40 bridges in three Indiana counties: Parke, Putnam, and Vermillion. He built the bridges during a 33-year period.  He lived to age 90.

Work credits
 

Works (credit) include:
Cox Ford Bridge, N of Rockville off US 41, Rockville, IN (Britton,J. A.), NRHP-listed
Harry Evans Bridge, SE of Mecca off Old Greencastle Rd., Mecca, IN (Britton,J. A.), NRHP-listed
Jeffries Ford Bridge, SW of Bridgeton, Bridgeton, IN (Britton,J. A.), NRHP-listed
Leatherwood Station Bridge, E of Montezuma, Montezuma, IN (Britton,J. A.), NRHP-listed
Lusk Home and Mill Site, Off IN 47 in Turkey Run State Park, Marshall, IN (Britton,J.A.), NRHP-listed
Marshall Bridge, N of Rockville, Rockville, IN (Britton,J. A.), NRHP-listed
McAllister Bridge, N of Bridgeton, Bridgeton, IN (Britton,J. A.), NRHP-listed

Narrows Bridge (Indiana), N of Rockville Off IN 47, Rockville, IN (Britton,J. A.), NRHP-listed
Nevins Bridge, NW of Bridgeton, Bridgeton, IN (Britton,J. A. & Son), NRHP-listed
Phillips Bridge, SE of Montezuma off US 36, Montezuma, IN (Britton,J. A.), NRHP-listed
Sim Smith Bridge, SE of Montezuma off US 36, Montezuma, IN (Britton,J. A.), NRHP-listed
State Sanitorium Bridge, E of Rockville off US 36, Rockville, IN (Britton,J. A.), NRHP-listed
Thorpe Ford Bridge, SE of Mecca on Rosedale Catlin Rd., Mecca, IN (Britton,J. A.), NRHP-listed
Zacke Cox Bridge, SE of Mecca off US 41, Mecca, IN (Britton,J. A.), NRHP-listed

Family
J. A. Britton's son, Eugene Britton, built the Bowsher Ford Covered Bridge, a single span Burr Arch truss covered bridge structure, in 1915. On February 18, 1909, Eugene Britton was elected a director of the newly formed National Reserve Bank of the City of New York.

References

20th-century American architects
1839 births
People from Rockville, Indiana
1929 deaths
19th-century American architects